Oraiokastro is a municipality in the Thessaloniki regional unit, Greece and a suburb of Thessaloniki.

Municipality
The municipality Oraiokastro was formed at the 2011 local government reform by the merger of the following 3 former municipalities, that became municipal units:
Kallithea
Mygdonia
Oraiokastro

The municipality Oraiokastro has an area of 217.855 km2 and the municipal unit Oraiokastro has an area of 21.855 km2.

Religious buildings

The Temple of the Hellenic Gods (Ελληνων Ναος), a Hellenic temple, is located in Oraiokastro, Central Macedonia.

References

Municipalities of Central Macedonia
Populated places in Thessaloniki (regional unit)